Jürg Grossen (born 24 August 1969) is a Swiss politician. He is a member of the National Council. Since 2017, he has been the president of the Green Liberal Party of Switzerland.

Biography
Grossen was born in the town of Frutigen in the Canton of Bern. He apprenticed as an electrical planner and worked for a solar energy company. After the death of the company's owner, Grossen and a colleague were left in charge of the firm.

He joined the Green Liberal Party, which was founded in 2007 and later opened a cantonal affiliate in Bern. In 2011, he ran for the National Council. Grossen was elected as the party increased its vote share to 5.4% with 12 seats. In 2015, he was re-elected.

Grossen was named as a party vice president in 2016. In 2017, the party president, Martin Bäumle announced his intent to leave the post. Grossen was elected to succeed Bäumle.

In the 2019 election, Grossen was re-elected and the Green Liberals increased the vote share to 7.8%, taking 16 seats.

Grossen has advocated for the end of nuclear power in Switzerland. He is a supporter of marriage equality. As part of his party's climate plan, Grossen supported 
ending subsidies to cattle farmers to reduce meat consumption and increase payments to plant-based products.

References

External links
Official Swiss Parliament website
Official website

1969 births
Living people
Swiss politicians
People from the canton of Bern
Members of the National Council (Switzerland)
21st-century Swiss politicians